The 1982 Pacific Tri-Nations was the first edition of the Pacific Tri-Nations tournament competed for between Fiji, Tonga and Western Samoa with each team playing the other two teams once. Western Samoa were the inaugural winners winning both of their matches.

Table

Fixtures

References

1982
1982 rugby union tournaments for national teams
Fiji national rugby union team matches
Tonga national rugby union team matches
Samoa national rugby union team matches
1982 in Oceanian rugby union